S. K. Shivakumar (1953 – 13 April 2019) was an Indian scientist from Karnataka state who worked at the Indian Space Research Organisation (ISRO) centres. He was awarded the Padma Shri, the fourth highest civilian award of India, in 2015.

Early life and education 
Shivakumar was born in 1953 in Mysore in Mysore State (now Karnataka), India. He earned a BSc from Mysore University followed by a BE in Electrical Communications Engineering and an MTech in Physical Engineering from the Indian Institute of Science, Bangalore. He received PhD in Electronics from Kuvempu University in 2014.

Career
He joined the Indian Space Research Organisation (ISRO) and started his career at its ISRO Telemetry, Tracking and Command Network (ISTRAC), Sriharikota in 1976. He later worked in its Indian Space Research Organisation Satellite Centre (ISAC) from 1978 to 1998. He was the project director for the development of the  dish antenna of the Indian Deep Space Network which is used for telemetry for the missions such as the Chandrayaan-1, India's first lunar exploration mission and Mangalyaan, India's first interplanetary mission.

He was involved in several satellite missions such as Bhaskara, Indian National Satellite System (INSAT), Ariane Passenger Payload Experiment (APPLE) and Indian Remote Sensing Programme (IRS). Shivakumar was the mission director of the IRS-1B and IRS-1C satellite missions. He also served as the director of the ISTRAC between September 1998 and November 2010. Shivakumar was later the associate director of the ISAC from November 2010 to June 2012 and director of the program from July 2012 to March 2015. As of 2019, he was serving as chairman of Karnataka Science and Technology Council.

Death
He died on 13 April 2019 at the age of 66 in Bangalore and was cremated at the Banashankari Crematorium. The cause of death was reported to be post-hepatic jaundice.

Awards

Padma Shri, the fourth highest civilian award of India, in 2015
Karnataka Rajyotsava Award (2008)
Nadoja Award (2013)
Honorary Doctorate (DSc) by the Mysore University

References

1953 births
2019 deaths
Kannada people
Scientists from Mysore
Indian Space Research Organisation people
Indian lunar exploration programme
Indian Institute of Science alumni
Recipients of the Padma Shri in science & engineering
20th-century Indian engineers
Engineers from Karnataka
Recipients of the Rajyotsava Award 2008